"Diamonds for Tears" is the second single from the album Revolution Roulette by the Finnish rock band Poets of the Fall. The single was released in Finland on 20 May 2008 and contains two versions of the title track as well as a live recording of the song Carnival of Rust and the video to the band's previous single "The Ultimate Fling".

Track listing
 Diamonds for Tears (radio edit)
 Diamonds for Tears (album version)
 Carnival of Rust (live)
Bonus: The Ultimate Fling music video

Charts

References

2008 singles
Poets of the Fall songs
2008 songs